José Rafael Tobar Lemus (born 24 November 1975 in Turín) is a Salvadoran football player who plays as defender for Alacranes Del Norte of  El Salvador.

Club career
Tobar started his career at hometown club Turín in the third division and joined Salvadoran second division side Huracán in 1992. After a short spell at Once Lobos he made his debut at the highest domestic level, the Primera División de Fútbol de El Salvador, with Luis Ángel Firpo in 1996 and in 1998 he won the league title with them. After two more championships, he left Firpo for rivals FAS for whom he debuted in November 2000 against Atlético Balboa and with whom he won five league titles. In December 2006 Tobar was put on the transfer list and finally moved to Isidro Metapán only to rejoin Firpo for a season. He then had spells at Juventud Independiente and Nejapa who were later renamed Alacranes Del Norte.

International career
Tobar made his debut for El Salvador in a November 1998 friendly match against Honduras and has earned a total of 7 caps, scoring no goals. He has represented his country in 2 FIFA World Cup qualification matches and played at the 2005 UNCAF Nations Cup.

His final international game was an August 2005 friendly match against Paraguay.

Honours
Primera División de Fútbol de El Salvador: 8
 1998/1999, 1999 Clausura, 2000 Clausura, 2002 Clausura, 2002 Apertura, 2003 Apertura, 2004 Apertura, 2005 Clausura

References

External links

Profile - CD FAS 

1975 births
Living people
People from Ahuachapán Department
Association football central defenders
Salvadoran footballers
El Salvador international footballers
C.D. Luis Ángel Firpo footballers
C.D. FAS footballers
A.D. Isidro Metapán footballers
C.D. Juventud Independiente players
Nejapa footballers
2005 UNCAF Nations Cup players